Nationality words link to articles with information on the nation's poetry or literature (for instance, Irish or France).

Events
 March 23 – A surprise best-seller in the United Kingdom is John Lennon's In His Own Write, a compendium of nonsense writing, sketches and drawings by one of the Beatles, published today.
 March 29 (Easter Day) – Adrian Mitchell reads "To Whom It May Concern" to Campaign for Nuclear Disarmament protesters in Trafalgar Square, London.
 April 23 – The "Shakespeare Quartercentenary", the 400th anniversary of the birth of William Shakespeare falling around this date, is celebrated throughout the year in lecture series, exhibitions, dramatic and musical programs and other events as well as special publications (Shakespeare issues and supplements), reprinting of standard works on the playwright and poet, and the issue of commemorative postage stamps. The American Association of Advertising Agencies suggests that Shakespeare quotations should be used in advertisements. Celebrations of various kinds occur in the United Kingdom, the United States, France, Germany, Switzerland, Sweden, Denmark, Finland and elsewhere. The Shakespeare Birthplace Trust opens the Shakespeare Centre, housing its library and research facilities, in Stratford-upon-Avon (England).
 June
 The 75th birthday of Anna Akhmatova, who was severely persecuted during the Stalin era, is celebrated around this time with special observances and the publication of new collections of her verse.
 After the murder of American civil rights activist Andrew Goodman, poet Mary Doyle Curran finds and publishes a poem he had written for her college class, "A Corollary to a Poem by A. E. Housman."
 December – Poetry Australia literary magazine founded.
 John Berryman's 77 Dream Songs, published this year, wins the 1965 Pulitzer Prize in Poetry.
 Russian poet Joseph Brodsky is convicted of "parasitism" in a Soviet court, which sends him into exile near the Arctic Circle.
 Among the many books of poetry published this year, Robert Lowell's For the Union Dead is greeted with particular acclaim. The book is received with "general jubilation" from critics, according to Raymond Walters Jr., associate editor of the New York Times Book Review. "These verses [...] convinced many observers that its author was now the pre-eminent U.S. poet."
 The publication in the United Kingdom of The Complete Poems of D. H. Lawrence in two volumes is "a major publishing event of 1964".

Works published in English
Listed by nation where the work was first published and again by the poet's native land, if different; substantially revised works listed separately:

Australia
 Geoffrey Dutton, The Literature of Australia
 Gwen Harwood, Poems, Australian poet published in the United Kingdom
 T. Inglis Moore, and Douglas Stewart, editors, Poetry in Australia, 2 volumes, Sydney: Angus and Robertson
 Oodgeroo Noonuccal (Kath Walker), We Are Going: Poems, first book of verse by an Aboriginal Australian
 David Rowbotham, All the Room, Australian poetry prize winner
 R. Ward, Penguin Book of Australian Ballads, anthology
 Judith Wright, Five Senses selected poems; Australian poet published in the United Kingdom

Canada
 Earle Birney:
Near False Creek Mouth. Toronto: McClelland and Stewart.
 Two Poems. Halifax.
 George Bowering, Points on the Grid
 Leonard Cohen, Flowers for Hitler, including "The Only Tourist in Havana Turns his Thoughts Homeward"
 John Robert Colombo, Poesie / Poetry 64
 Pierre Coupey, Bring Forth the Cowards
 Phyllis Gotlieb, Within the Zodiac, her first work
 John Glassco, A Point of Sky
 Irving Layton, The Laughing Rooster
 Dorothy Livesay, The Colour of God's Face.
 Gwendolyn MacEwen, The Rising Fire
 Eli Mandel, Black and Secret Man
 F. R. Scott, Events and Signals. Toronto: Ryerson Press.
 Raymond Souster, The Colour of the Times, 250 poems collected from a dozen of his previous volumes. Governor General's Award 1964.
 David Wevill, Birth of a Shark, a first collection; Canadian poet published in the United Kingdom

Anthologies in Canada
 Poetry of Mid-Century 1940/1960, edited by Milton Wilson, included the work of 10 well-known Canadian poets:

 Margaret Avison
 Earle Birney
 Leonard Cohen
 Irving Layton

 Jay Macpherson
 Kenneth McRobbie
 Alden Nowlan

 P. K. Page
 James Reaney
 Raymond Souster

Poésie/Poetry 64, edited by John Robert Colombo and Jacques Godbout;an anthology of lesser-known poets, including:

 Margaret Atwood
 George Bowering
 Frank Davey
 K. V. Hertz

 Harry Howith
 Lionel Kearns
 John Newlove

 Gwendolyn MacEwen
 Henry Moskovitch
 Myra von Riedemann

Criticism, scholarship and biography in Canada
 Northrop Frye, Fables of Identity, 16 essays on "various works and authors in the central tradition of English mythopoeic poetry"
 Roy Daniells, Milton, Mannerism and Baroque

India, in English
 Monika Varma, Dragonflies Draw Flame ( Poetry in English ), Calcutta: Writers Workshop, India.
 Lawrence Bantleman, Man's Fall and Woman's Fall out (according to another source the last word in the title is "Fallout"),, Calcutta: Writers Workshop, India.
 M. R. Bhagavan, Poems ( Poetry in English ), Calcutta: Writers Workshop, India.
 Mohinder Monga, Through the Night, Raptly ( Poetry in English ), Calcutta: Writers Workshop, India.
 Leslie de Noronha, Poems ( Poetry in English ), Calcutta: Writers Workshop, India.
 G. V. Subbaramayya, Lover's Fulfilment and Other Poems, Tenali: Rishi Publications
 Viresh Chander Dutt, The Voice of Ancient India, Calcutta: Kalyan Chander Dutt
 A. K. Ramanujan, translator, Fifteen Tamil Love Poems, translated from the original Tamil; Calcutta: Writers Workshop, Indiap

New Zealand
 Fleur Adcock, Eye of the Hurricane, Wellington: Reed (New Zealand poet who moved to England in 1963)
 Charles Brasch: Ambulando: Poems, Christchurch: Caxton Press
 Alistair Campbell, Wild Honey, London: Oxford University Press

United Kingdom
 Samuel Beckett, translator from the original French, "Comment C'est" 1961, How It Is, Irish poet published in the United Kingdom
 Sir John Betjeman, Ring of Bells
 Thomas Blackburn, A Breathing Space
 Donald Davie, Events and Wisdoms, London: Routledge and Kegan Paul (Middletown, Connecticut: Wesleyan University Press, 1965)
 Patric Dickinson, This Cold Universe
 Keith Douglas, Selected Poems (posthumous), edited by Ted Hughes
 Lawrence Durrell, Selected Poems: 1953–1963, edited by Alan Ross
 Gavin Ewart, Londoners
 Ian Hamilton Finlay, Telegrams from My Windmill, Edinburgh: Wild Hawthorn Press
 Zulfikar Ghose, The Loss of India by a Pakistani, published in the United Kingdom
 Robert Graves, Man Does, Woman Is
 Ian Hamilton, Pretending Not to Sleep
 Tony Harrison, Earthworks
 Gwen Harwood, Poems, Australian poet published in the United Kingdom
 Philip Hobsbaum, The Place's Fault
 Elizabeth Jennings, Recoveries
 Patrick Kavanagh, Collected Poems, London: MacGibbon and Kee
 Philip Larkin, The Whitsun Weddings, London: Faber and Faber
 D. H. Lawrence, The Complete Poems in two volumes (posthumous), edited by Vivian de Sola Pinto and F. Warren Roberts, with poems in chronological order and an introduction by Pinto.
 John Lennon, In His Own Write, containing nonsensical poems, sketches and drawings; a best seller by the member of the Beatles
 C. S. Lewis, Poems
 Douglas Livingstone, Sjambok by a Rhodesian poet
 Edward Lucie-Smith, Confessions and Histories
 John Masefield, Old Raiger, and Other Verse
 Adrian Mitchell, Poems
 Peter Porter, Poems Ancient & Modern, Lowestoft, Suffolk: Scorpion Press
 Peter Redgrove, At the White Monument
 Nathaniel Tarn, Old Savage/Young City
 R.S. Thomas:
 The Bread of Truth
 "Words and the Poet" (lecture)
 David Wevill, Birth of a Shark, a first collection; Canadian poet published in the United Kingdom
 Judith Wright, Five Senses selected poems; Australian poet published in the United Kingdom

Criticism, scholarship, and biography in the United Kingdom
 Poetry of the Thirties, a Penguin Books anthology; including the last published appearance during the lifetime of W. H. Auden of his, "September 1, 1939", a poem which he was famous for, but which he hated; the poem appeared in the edition with a note about this and four other early poems: "Mr. W. H. Auden considers these five poems to be trash which he is ashamed to have written."
 G. Hartmann, Wordsworth's Poetry, 1787-1814

United States
 Conrad Aiken, A Seizure of Limericks
 A. R. Ammons, Expressions of Sea Level
 Ted Berrigan, The Sonnets Holt, Rinehart & Winston
 Wendell Berry, The Broken Ground
 John Berryman, 77 Dream Songs, New York: Farrar, Straus & Giroux
 Joseph Payne Brennan, Nightmare Need
 John Ciardi, Person to Person
 Peter Davison, The Breaking of the Day
 James Dickey:
 Helmets
 Two Poems of the Air
 Ed Dorn:
 Hands Up!, Totem Press
 From Gloucester Out, Matrix Press
 Horace Gregory, Collected Poems
 Donald Hall, A Roof of Tiger Lilies, New York: Viking
 Robert Duncan, Roots and Branches
 Richard Eberhart, The Qyuarry
 Jean Garrigue, Country Without Maps
 Donald Hall, A Roof of Tiger Lilies
 LeRoi Jones, The Dead Lecturer, New York: Grove Press
 Galway Kinnell, Flower Herding on Mount Monadnock, Boston: Houghton Mifflin
 Denise Levertov, O Taste and See, New York: New Directions
 Robert Lowell, For the Union Dead New York: Farrar, Straus and Giroux (for more information, see "Events" section, above)
 William Meredith, The Wreck of the Thresher and Other Poems
 Vladimir Nabokov, translator, Eugene Onegin by Aleksandr Pushkin
 Frank O'Hara, Lunch Poems
 Elder Olson, Collected Poems
 Ezra Pound, editor, Confucius to Cummings: An Anthology of Poetry
 Kenneth Rexroth:
 Natural Numbers
 (translator), 100 Poems from the Japanese
 Theodore Roethke (died 1963):
 The Far Field, Garden City, New York: Doubleday
 Sequence, Sometimes Metaphysical
 M. L. Rosenthal, Blue Boy on Skates
 E. N. Sargent, The African Boy
 Anne Sexton, Selected Poems
 Karl Shapiro, The Bourgeois Poet, New York: Random House
 Jack Spicer, Language
 Mark Strand, Sleeping With One Eye Open
 Robert Sward, Kissing the Dancer and Other Poems
 Mark Van Doren, Collected and New Poems
 Donald Wandrei, Poems for Midnight

Criticism, scholarship, and biography in the United States
 Phyllis Grosskurth, John Addington Symonds: A Biography (Canadian scholar publishing in the United States), winner of the 1964 Governor General's Awards in Canada
 Hugh Kenner, editor, Seventeenth Century Poetry: The Schools of Donne & Jonson, Canadian writing and published in the United States
 Vladimir Nabokov, Notes on Prosody, Russian native writing and published in the United States

Other in English
 Kofi Awoonor, Rediscovery and Other Poems, Ghanaian poet published in Ghana
 Samuel Beckett, translator from the original French, Comment C'est 1961, How It Is, Irish poet published in the United Kingdom
 Denis Devlin, Collected Poems, including "Renewal by Her Element" (see also Collected Poems 1989), Ireland
 Zulfikar Ghose, The Loss of India Pakistani poet, published in the United Kingdom
 Eoghan Ó Tuairisc, Ireland
 The Weekend of Dermot and Grace
 Lux Aeterna, including Hiroshima Mass
 Hone Tūwhare, No Ordinary Sun, Māori poet writing in English, New Zealand

Works in other languages
Listed by nation where the work was first published and again by the poet's native land, if different; substantially revised works listed separately:

Danish
 Inger Christensen, Graess
 Klaus Rifbjerg, Portraet
 Knud Holst, Trans
 Jørgen Sonne, Krese

French

Canada, in French
 Marie-Claire Blais, Existences, Québec: Éditions Garneau
 Jacques Brault, Mémoire
 Paul Chamberland, L'Afficheur hurle
 Gilbert Choquette, L'Honneur de vivre
 Cécile Cloutier, Cuivre et soies
 Paul-Marie Lapointe, Pour les âmes
 Fernand Oullette, Le Soliel sous la mort

France
 Louis Aragon, near simultaneous publication of four works:
 Series of discussions with F. Crémieux on the philosophical and literary ideas of the poet
 Il ne m'est Paris que d'Elsa, a collection of poems
 a "lengthy and ambitious historical poem"
 Le Voyage en Hollande
 René Char:
 Commune Presence
 Les Matinaux
 Michel Deguy, Biefs
 Jean Follain, Appareil de la terre
 Roger Giroux, L'arbre temps, winner of the Prix Max Jacob, the author's sole published book during his lifetime
 Edmond Jabès, Le Livre de Yukel
 A. Marissel, La Nouvelle parabole, winner of the first Louise Labé Prize
 Pierre Oster, La Grande Année
 Marcelin Pleynet, Paysages en deux suivis de Les Lignes de la prose
 Jean-Pierre Richard, Onze Etudes sur la poésie moderne, criticism
 Denis Roche, Les Idées centésimales de Miss Elanize

Anthologies
 J. L. Bédouin, editor, La Poésie surréaliste
 G. E. Clancier, editor, Panorama critique de Chénier á Baudelaire

German
 Erich Fried, Warngedichte
 Hans Magnus Enzensberger, Blindenschrift
 Walter Höllerer, Der andere Gast
 Günter Eich, Zu den Akten

Hebrew
 Yaakov Cahan, the collected works
 Esther Rab, Shirai-
 Leah Goldberg, Im ha-Laila Hazeh ("On This Night")
 Daliah Rivikovich, Horef Kasheh ("Hard Winter")
 Dan Pagis, Shehut Mauhereth ("Belated Lingering")
 David Avidan, Masheu Bishvil Mishehu ("Something for Someone")
 Amir Gilboa, Kehulim Vaadumin ("The Blues and the Reds")
 Eldad Andan, Lo Bishmahot kalot ("Not with Joys Lightly")
 B. Mordecai, Nefilim ba-Aretz ("Giants on Earth")
 Aaron Zeitlin, Min ha-Adam Vomaila ("From Man and Higher"), comprising two dramatic poems by this American publishing in Israel
 Chaim Brandwein, be-Tzel ha-Argaman ("In the Shadow of the Purple"), a first book of poems by this American publishing in Israel
 Abraham Regelson, Hakukot Otiotaich ("Engraved Are Thy Letters"), by an American poet living in Israel

Italian
 Bartolo Cattafi, L'osso, l'anima
 Corrado Costa, Pseudobaudelaire avant-garde poetry
 Eugenio Miccini, Sonetto minore avant-garde poetry
 Elio Pagliarani, La lezione di fisica avant-garde poetry
 Pier Paulo Pasolini, Poesia in forma di rosa
 Lamberto Pignotti, La nozione dell'uomo avant-garde poetry
 Antonio Porta, Aprire avant-garde poetry
 Edoardo Sanguineti, Triperuno avant-garde poetry
 Cesare Vivaldi, Dettagli avant-garde poetry
 Gruppo '63 (published this spring), an anthology of poems, critical essays, and passages from plays and novels by writers who had rebelled in recent years against standard conventions in literature.

Norwegian
 Ernst Orvil, Kontakt
 Astrid Hjertenaes Andersen, Frokost 'i det grønne
 Harald Sverdrup, Sang til solen

Russian
 Bella Akhmadulina, "published an extensive sheaf of nonpolitical, impressionistic verse", according to Harrison E. Salisbury
 Alexander Mezhirov, Прощание со снегом ("Farewell to the Snow"), Russia, Soviet Union
 Andrei Voznesensky, "a number of poems, including several devoted to Lenin", according to Harrison E. Salisbury

Portuguese language

Brazil
 Lupe Cotrim Garaude, O poeta e o mundo, her fourth collection

Spanish language

Latin America
 Jorge Carrera Andrade, Floresta de los Guacamayos (Ecuador), published in Nicaragua while he was ambassador to the United States
 Jorge Luis Borges, El otro, el mismo (Argentina)
 Arturo Corcuera, Primavera triunfante (Peru)
 Gonzalo Rojas, Contra la muerte (Chile)
 Pablo Neruda, Memorial de Isla Negra (Chile), the first of his 5-volume poetic memoir
 Roque Vallejos, Los arcángeles ebrios (Paraguay)
 Sarah Bollo (Uruguay):
 Diana transfigurada
 Tierra y Cielo

Anthologies
 Instituto Torcuato Di Tella, Poesía argentina (sic), including selections from 10 Argentinian poets, most born in the 1920s or later
 Oscar Echeverri Mejía and Alfonso Bonilla-Naar, editors, 21 años de poesía colombiana (sic), with poems from the more prominent Colombian poets in the two decades from 1942 to 1963

Criticism, scholarship, and biography in Latin America
 Raúl Silva Castro, Pablo Neruda, an analysis of his poetry
 Jorge Carrera Andrade, Interpretación de Rubén Darío (Nicaragua)
 Luis Alberto Cabrales, Rubén Darío, breve biografía (Nicaragua)
 Rubén Darío periodista, a collection of his journalism compiled by the Nicaragua Ministry of Public Education

Spain
 Jorge Guillén, Tréboles
 José García Nieto, La hora undécima
 Gerardo Diego, La suerte o la muerte
 Fernando Quiñones, En vida, winner of the Leopoldo Panero Prize by the Instituto de Cultura Hispánica

Criticism, scholarship and biography in Spain
 Gabriel Celaya, Exploración de la poesía
 José Francisco Cirré, La poesía de José Moreno Villa
Books published for the centenary year of Miguel de Unamuno (died 1936), an essayist, novelist, poet, playwright and philosopher:
 Manuel García Blanco, América y Unamuno
 Julio César Chaves, Unamuno y América
 Julio García Morejón, Unamuno y Portugal
 Sebastián de la Nuez, Unamuno en Canarias
 Ricardo Gullón, Autobiografías de Unamuno

Yiddish
 Mordkhay gebirtig, a new edition of the poet's works
 Itskhok Katzenelson, a new edition of the poet's works
 Abraham Sutzkever, a two-volume edition of the poet's works
 Joseph Rubinstein, Khurbn Polyn ("Polish Jewry: a Lament")
 Binem Heler, a book of poems
 Yankev Zonshayn, a book of poems
 P. Tsibulski, a book of poems
 I. Papiernikov, a book of poems
 I. Manik, a book of poems
 I. Goykhberg, a book of poems
 Rosa Gutman, a book of poems
 Aleph Katz, a book of poems

Other
 Breyten Breytenbach, Die ysterkoei moet sweet ("The Iron Cow Must Sweat"), South African in Afrikaans
 Ernst Enno, Väike luuleraamat, Estonia
 Lars Forstell, Röster (Sweden)
 Ismail Kadare, Përse mendohen këto male ("What Are These Mountains Musing On?"), Albania
 Eeva Liisa Manner, Niin vaihtuivat vuoden ajat (Finland)
 Sean O Riordain, Brosna, including "Claustrophobia", "Reo" and "Fiabhras", Gaelic-language, Ireland
 Rituraj, Main Angiras, Alwar: Kavita Prakashan; India, Hindi-language
 Hijam Anganhal Singh, Khamba Thoibi Sherireng, abdidged form of the popular Khamba Thoibi folk ballad, sung on festive occasions and about the last incarnation of Khamba and Thoibi; one of the first epics in modern Meitei poetry; written in 1940 but first published this year; India
 Arvo Turtiainen, Runoja 1934-1964 (Finland)

Awards and honors

Australia
 Grace Leven Prize for Poetry: David Rowbotham, All the Room

Canada
 1964 Governor General's Awards:
 No poetry award for English this year
 Poetry award (French): Gratien Lapointe, Ode au Saint-Laurent

United Kingdom
 Eric Gregory Award: Robert Nye, Ken Smith, Jean Symons, Ted Walker
 Queen's Gold Medal for Poetry: R. S. Thomas

United States
 Consultant in Poetry to the Library of Congress (later the post would be called "Poet Laureate Consultant in Poetry to the Library of Congress"): Reed Whittemore appointed this year.
 National Book Award for Poetry: John Crowe Ransom, Selected Poems
 Pulitzer Prize for Poetry: Louis Simpson: At The End Of The Open Road
 Fellowship of the Academy of American Poets: Elizabeth Bishop
 Presidential Medal of Freedom awarded by President Lyndon Johnson to 30 people, including Carl Sandburg

Other
 Danish Academy's literature prize: Erik Knudsen, a poet and playwright
 Critics' Prize for Poetry (Spain): María Elvira Lacaci
 Leopoldo Panero Prize, given by the Instituto de Cultura Hispánica (Spain): Fernando Quiñones, for En vida

Births
 February 18 – David Biespiel, American poet, editor and critic
 May 7 – Kathy Shaidle, Canadian author, columnist and poet
 July 7 – Karina Galvez, Ecuadorian poet
 July 11 – Craig Charles, English actor, presenter and performance poet
 Also:
 Rafael Campo, gay Cuban-American poet, doctor and author
 Beth Gylys, American poet and professor

Deaths
Birth years link to the corresponding "[year] in poetry" article:
 January 5 – Leslie Holdsworth Allen, Australian academic and poet (born 1879)
 January 22 – Zora Cross (born 1890), Australian poet
 March 12 – Abbas Al Akkad عباس محمود العقاد (born 1889), Egyptian, Arabic-language writer and poet, a founder of the Divan school of poetry
 April 5 – Tatsuji Miyoshi 三好達治 (born 1900), Japanese, Shōwa period literary critic, editor and poet
 April 26 – E. J. Pratt, 81 (born 1882), Canadian poet
 May 5 – Nagata Mikihiko 長田幹彦 (born 1887), Japanese, Shōwa period poet, playwright and screenwriter
 June 7 – Takamure Itsue 高群逸枝 (born 1894), Japanese poet, writer, feminist, anarchist, ethnologist and historian
 September 18 – Clive Bell, 83 (born 1881), English critic
 October 10 – Oscar Williams, 64 (born 1900), American poet and anthologist
 December 9 – Dame Edith Sitwell, 77 (born 1887), English poet and critic, heart attack
 December 29 – Rofū Miki 三木 露風, pen name of Masao Miki, 75 (born 1889), Japanese Symbolist poet and writer

See also

 Poetry
 List of poetry awards
 List of years in poetry

Notes

Poetry
20th-century poetry